The Chignecto Basin is a basin between New Brunswick and Nova Scotia of southeastern Canada. It is a sub-basin of the Fundy Basin.

References

Geology of New Brunswick
Geology of Nova Scotia
Geography of Westmorland County, New Brunswick